Oxylides albata, Aurivillius' common false head, is a butterfly in the family Lycaenidae. It is found in Nigeria (the Cross River Loop), Cameroon, the Republic of the Congo, the Central African Republic, the Democratic Republic of the Congo (Mongala, Uele, Tshopo, Ituri and Equateur), western Uganda and Rwanda.

Description

albata Auriv. ( = feminina E. Sharpe [not a synonym = Oxylides feminina Sharpe, 1904)] (67 a) only deviates [from Oxylides faunus ] by the hindwing above being at the proximal margin at least in la white or greyish-white, and at the anal angle much broader white; in the female the white marginal band in area is at least 4 mm broad, and reaches anteriorly to vein 6. Congo District and Uganda.

Biology
The habitat consists of forests.

References

External links
Die Gross-Schmetterlinge der Erde 13: Die Afrikanischen Tagfalter. Plate XIII 67 a

Butterflies described in 1895
Theclinae
Butterflies of Africa